This is a list of launches made by the LGM-25 Titan ICBMs, and their derivatives.

Launch statistics 
Rockets from the Titan family accumulated 368 launches between 1959 and 2005, 322 of which were successful, yielding a  success rate.

Launches

See also 

 List of Atlas launches
 List of Thor and Delta launches

References

Titan
 Titan (rocket family)